2022 Dreamcatcher World Tour Apocalypse: Save Us, also known as 2022 Dreamcatcher World Tour [Apocalypse: Save Us] was a worldwide concert tour by the South Korean girl group Dreamcatcher. The tour began on June 28, 2022 in North America.

Background 

On April 27, 2022, Dreamcatcher announced the 2022 Dreamcatcher World Tour [Apocalypse: Save Us], scheduled to take place from June 28 to July 20. Prior to the tour, the group performed at the Primavera Sound festival in Barcelona, Spain.

Ticket sales for Dreamcatcher’s new concert began on June 15 at 8:00 a.m. PST through Ticketmaster. The North American leg of the tour was originally set to conclude in Los Angeles, but the group later added a new show in Mexico City at the Auditorio BB on July 20.

The concert in Los Angeles on July 17 was also livestreamed to paying customers.

Set list

Tour dates

References 

Apocalypse
2022 concert tours
Concert tours of the United States
Concert tours of Mexico
June 2022 events in the United States
July 2022 events in the United States